The Panar are a Muslim community of Gujarat, India.

Panar may also refer to:
 Tamil Panar, an ancient and mediaeval musical community of South India
 Panar (Kundapura), a community of Karnataka, India
 Panhar, or Pānar, a village in Hormozgan Province, Iran
 Panar, a tributary of the Mahananda River of India and Bangladesh

See also 
 Pana (disambiguation)